John Peers and John-Patrick Smith but Peers chose not to compete.
Smith chose to compete with Samuel Groth and lost to eventual champion Steve Johnson and Tim Smyczek.
They defeated Jarmere Jenkins and Donald Young 6–4, 6–3.

Seeds

Draw

Main draw

References
 Main Draw
 Qualifying Draw

Charlottesville Men's Pro Challenger - Doubles
2013 Doubles